Man-su (pronounced ), also spelled Man-soo, is a Korean masculine given name. Its meaning differs based on the hanja used to write each syllable of the name. There are 19 hanja with the reading "man" and 67 hanja with the reading "soo" on the South Korean government's official list of hanja which may be registered for use in given names.

People with this name include:
Kang Man-soo (born 1955), South Korean volleyball player
Lee Man-soo (born 1958), South Korean baseball coach and former catcher
Kim Man-su (born 1996), South Korean baseball catcher
Kim Man-su (politician), North Korean politician elected in the 2014 North Korean parliamentary election

Fictional characters with this name include:
Mansu, one of the title characters of 1988 South Korean film Chilsu and Mansu
Man-soo, character in 2007 South Korean television series Likeable or Not
Oh Man-soo, character in 2017 South Korean television series Black

See also
List of Korean given names

References

Korean masculine given names